Go Won-hee (born Kim Won-hee on September 12, 1994) is a South Korean actress. She began her entertainment career as a commercial model in 2011, and became the youngest ever model for Asiana Airlines in 2012. She then began acting, and has since starred in films and television dramas such as Blooded Palace: The War of Flowers (2013), My Dear Cat (2014), and Tabloid Truth (2014). In 2015, she joined the cast of sketch comedy/variety show Saturday Night Live Korea.

Personal life
Go was an idol trainee, and she was set to debut with girl group Fiestar, but eventually did not.

Relationship 
On September 16, 2022, Go’s agency confirmed that Go will marry an older non-celebrity boyfriend. They married in a private ceremony on October 7, 2022, at Hotel Shilla in Seoul, attended by their parents and friends of both families.

Filmography

Film

Television series

Web series

Television  show

Music video appearances

Awards and nominations

References

External links 
 
 
 

1994 births
Living people
South Korean television actresses
South Korean film actresses
South Korean web series actresses
Chung-Ang University alumni

Hanlim Multi Art School alumni